Sandra Lanham (born 1948) is the founder and sole pilot of Environmental Flying Services, a non-profit organization located in Tucson, Arizona.

E-Flying was created to help researchers and scientists such as Conservation International.
She offers her flying services at no charge, charging only for fuel costs and expenses.  Grants support her operations.

Awards
 2001 MacArthur Fellows Program

References

External links
An Overview of environmental and other impacts of the Potential DKRW LNG plant/pipeline and Arizona Clean Fuels refinery in Tacna, Arizona with oil port and pipeline.

1948 births
MacArthur Fellows
People from Tucson, Arizona
Living people